Events from the year 1919 in Argentina

Incumbents
 President: Hipólito Yrigoyen
 Vice president: Pelagio B. Luna

Governors
 Buenos Aires Province: José Camilo Crotto 
 Cordoba: Julio Borda then Rafael Núñez
 Mendoza Province: 
 until 17 February: José Néstor Lencinas
 17 February-12 April: Tomás de Veyga
 12 April-25 July: Perfecto Araya
 from 25 July: José Néstor Lencinas

Vice Governors
 Buenos Aires Province: Luis Monteverde

Events
January 7–14 - Tragic Week (Argentina)

Births
 May 7 – Eva Perón, First Lady
 July 3 – Mauro Cía, boxer
 August 7 – Bertha Moss, actress

Deaths
June 25 - Pelagio Luna, politician

References

 
Years of the 20th century in Argentina
1910s in Argentina
Argentina